Symphyotrichum graminifolium (formerly Conyza graminifolia and Aster cabrerae) is a species of flowering plant in the family Asteraceae native to the South American countries of Argentina, Bolivia, Brazil, Paraguay, and Uruguay. Its numerous flowers are in broad corymbiform arrays with lilac or bluish ray florets.

Citations

References

graminifolium
Flora of South America
Plants described in 1826
Taxa named by Kurt Polycarp Joachim Sprengel